Heidi L. M. Jacobs is a Canadian writer, whose debut novel Molly of the Mall: Literary Lass and Purveyor of Fine Footwear won the Stephen Leacock Memorial Medal for Humour in 2020.

Originally from Edmonton, Alberta, she is currently a librarian at the University of Windsor. Molly of the Mall is based in part on her own experience as a university student in the 1990s, centred on a character balancing her studies in literature with her job at a shoe store in a fictionalized version of the West Edmonton Mall. The novel was published by NeWest Press in 2019.

References

21st-century Canadian novelists
21st-century Canadian women writers
Canadian women novelists
Canadian librarians
Canadian women librarians
Writers from Edmonton
Writers from Windsor, Ontario
Stephen Leacock Award winners
Year of birth missing (living people)
Living people